Charles de Ligne (12 September 1895 – 14 November 1944) was a Belgian speed skater. Aged 40, he competed in four events at the 1936 Winter Olympics with the best result of 28th place over 10,000 m. 

De Ligne was a successful businessman and a decorated officer, who fought in World War I and was part of the Belgian underground movement during World War II, helping to rescue downed Allied pilots. He was married to figure skater Yvonne de Ligne, who fell in love with a young Dutch figure skater in 1944. She hired a man to kill de Ligne and made it look as if he was killed by the Gestapo. The murder was solved in 1945. Yvonne de Ligne was sentenced to 15 years, but was released after six years due to poor health, and died from tuberculosis shortly afterwards.

References

1895 births
1944 deaths
Belgian military personnel of World War I
Belgian resistance members
Belgian male speed skaters
Speed skaters at the 1936 Winter Olympics
Olympic speed skaters of Belgium
Male murder victims
Belgian murder victims
People murdered in Belgium
1944 murders in Belgium
Mariticides
Deaths by firearm in Belgium